The Mayor of Keelung is the chief political executive of the city of Keelung in Taiwan. The current mayor is George Hsieh.

List of mayors

Timeline

References

See also
Keelung